Elizabeth Bellamy (19 March 1845 – 18 August 1940) was an English Anglican missionary and teacher who served in Beirut. She was born in Birmingham, Birmingham, England on 19 March 1845. After her missionary labours, she moved to Dunedin, New Zealand.

References

1845 births
1940 deaths
New Zealand educators
English Anglican missionaries
New Zealand Anglicans
English emigrants to New Zealand
19th-century New Zealand people
Anglican missionaries in Syria
Anglican missionaries in Lebanon
Religious leaders from Dunedin